"Oh Julie" was a number one hit in the UK Singles Chart for one week for Shakin' Stevens in January 1982.

It is Stevens' third number-one single and his first as a writer. The B-side, "I'm Knockin'", was also written by Shakin' Stevens and both tracks benefit from arrangements driven by lead guitarist Mickey Gee. "Oh Julie" also has a cajun flavour courtesy of the accordion backing provided by Geraint Watkins.

Personnel 

 Shakin' Stevens – vocals
 Mickey Gee – lead guitar
 Geraint Watkins – piano, accordion
 Stuart Colman – bass guitar, producer
 Howard Tibble – drums
 Rod Houison – engineer

Chart performance

Weekly charts

Year-end charts

Certifications and sales

Cover versions
In September 1982, the song peaked at #38 in the US for Barry Manilow.
Sanford Clark also released a cover version.

Language versions
Swedish dance band Lasse Stefanz released a version in Swedish in 1982 that charted on the Sverigetopplistan, the official Swedish Singles Chart reaching number 16.
C. Jérôme released a French adaptation in 1982, named "Julie à la folie".
Benny released a German adaptation in 1982.

See also
List of European number-one hits of 1982
List of number-one hits in Norway
List of number-one hits (Sweden)
List of number-one hits of 1982 (Switzerland)
List of number-one singles from the 1980s (UK)

References

1982 singles
1982 songs
Shakin' Stevens songs
Lasse Stefanz songs
Barry Manilow songs
European Hot 100 Singles number-one singles
UK Singles Chart number-one singles
Number-one singles in Norway
Number-one singles in Sweden
Number-one singles in Switzerland
Epic Records singles